The eighth season of Winx Club aired from 15 April to 17 September 2019, on the Rai YoYo preschool channel in Italy. The English version premiered on Nickelodeon Asia on 8 January 2020.

This season was heavily retooled to appeal to a preschool target audience, and it is only loosely connected to the rest of the series. The creative team at RainbowSpA (which is co-owned by Viacom) restyled the characters to appear younger, and the plot lines were simplified. Most of the show's longtime crew members were not called back to work on this season, including art director Simone Borselli, who had designed the series' characters from season 1 to 7, and singer Elisa Rosselli, who had performed a majority of the songs.

In another change from previous seasons, Nickelodeon's American team served as consultants rather than directly overseeing the episodes; at the time, Nickelodeon was instead working with RainbowSpA on a new series called Club 57. The American writers remained as consultants for season 8 and Nick's Pierluigi Gazzolo continued in his role as a director for RainbowSpA. Also during this season's production, series creator Iginio Straffi stepped away from focusing on the series. He shifted his concentration to other work with Nickelodeon, including Club 57, as well as a live-action adaptation of Winx Club aimed at an older audience.

In 2019, Straffi explained his reasoning for gradually lowering the series' intended demographic:

Synopsis
The Winx Club notices that some of the stars in the sky are disappearing. They determine that the return of Valtor is linked to this strange occurrence. The fairies travel to Lumenia, the Magic Dimension's brightest star and the light source for Stella's home planet of Solaria. Lumenia's queen gives them the power of Cosmix to protect the magical universe's billions of stars. Along the way, the Winx also meet Twinkly; a helpful golden creature who powers the very core of Lumenia.

Episodes

References

Winx Club